Little people have been part of the folklore of many cultures in human history, including Ireland, Greece, the Philippines, the Hawaiian Islands, New Zealand, Flores Island, Indonesia, and Native Americans.

Native American folklore
The Native peoples of North America told legends of a race of "little people" who lived in the woods near sandy hills and sometimes near rocks located along large bodies of water, such as the Great Lakes. Often described as "hairy-faced dwarfs" in stories, petroglyph illustrations show them with horns on their head and traveling in a group of 5 to 7 per canoe.

Native legends often talk of the little people playing pranks on people, such as singing and then hiding when an inquisitive person searches for the music. It is often said that the little people love children and would take them away from bad or abusive parents or if the child was without parents and left in the woods to fend for themselves.

Other legends say the little people if seen by an adult human would beg them not to say anything of their existence and would reward those who kept their word by helping them and their family out in times of need. From tribe to tribe there are variations of what the little people's mannerisms were like, and whether they were good or evil may be different.

One of the common beliefs is that the little people create distractions to cause mischief. They were believed to be gods by some. One North American Native tribe believed that they lived in nearby caves. The caves were never entered for fear of disturbing the little people.

Legends of physical remains of tiny people being found in various locations in the Western United States, particularly Montana and Wyoming, typically describe the remains as being found in caves with various details such as descriptions that they were "perfectly formed", dwarf-size, etc. Often as an effort to "enhance credibility", archaeologist Lawrence L. Loendorf notes that some tales make claims that "the burials, of course, are always sent to a local university or to the Smithsonian for analysis, only to have both the specimens and research results disappear." Loendorf also suggests that the discovery of two mummies of anencephalic infants in the first half of the twentieth century with deformities that caused some people to believe they were adults has "contributed to public belief in the existence of a group of tiny prehistoric people."

Lewis and Clark reported in their journals that Native Americans in the vicinity of Spirit Mound, South Dakota held a belief in little people who inhabited the mound. Clark wrote that the local Native Americans could not be persuaded to approach the mound, as they feared these tiny "Deavals" and considered them to be dangerous. Although members of Lewis and Clark's party visited the mound, they did not encounter any unusual beings.

A graveyard unearthed in the 1830s in Coshocton County, Ohio, was believed to contain skeletons belonging to a pygmy race.

Native American

Alux - Maya
Canotila - Lakota
Chaneque - Aztec
Geow-lud-mo-sis-eg - Maliseet
Jogah- Iroquois
Mannegishi - Cree
Memegwesi/Memegawensi/Memengweshii/Pa'iins - Anishinaabe
Nimerigar - Shoshone
Nirumbee or Awwakkulé - Crow\
 Popo-li or Kowi Anukasha - Choctaw
Pukwudgie - Wampanoag
Yehasuri - Catawba
Yunwi Tsunsdi - Cherokee 

The Native American little people have been said to reside in the Pryor Mountains of Montana and Wyoming. The Pryors are famous for their "fairy rings" and strange happenings. Some members of the Crow tribe consider the little people to be sacred ancestors and require leaving an offering for them upon entry to the area.

Memegwaans

Ojibwe myths also bring up a creature known as the Memegwaans, or Memegwaanswag (Plural), which seems to be different from the more common Little People variation of Memegwesi. According to Basil H. Johnston, a Memegwaans is a little person without definitive form which is terrified of adult humans. However, it seems to have a soft spot for children and will often approach in the guise of a child any young person who seems upset, injured, scared or lonely and either protect them or keep them company until help arrives. If an adult sees one, they will often cower on the ground, screaming and crying hysterically before vanishing in the blink of an eye. They were also known as protectors of copper mines & were prayed to almost as patron saints of lost children. This is more specific & different from the Memegwesi, which is often simply described as a short, hairy man.

Types of little people in mythology
Abatwa (only partly mythical, see Twa for historical background)
Aziza (African mythology)
Brownies 
Christmas Elves
Clurichauns
Di sma undar jordi
Dokkaebi
Domovoi 
Duende 
Dwarves 
Ebu Gogo (Flores)
Egbere
Eloko
Elves
Far Darrig
Gnomes
Goblins
Gremlins
Grogoch
Heinzelmännchen
Hob 
Hobgoblin
Imp
Iratxo
Jenglot
Kabouter
Kaichigo
Kallikantzaros
Kandap - Tayap
Karzełek
Knocker
Kijimuna
Kobolds
Korpokkur
Krasnoludek
Laminak
Leprechauns
Lutins
Madebele  - Senufo mythology
Menehune - Hawaiian mythology
Muki
Niß Puk
Nimerigar
Nittaewo (Sri Lanka)
Nuno sa Punso
Patupaiarehe - New Zealand Maori mythology
Pixies
Polevik - Slavic mythology
Pombero - Guarani mythology
Pygmies (in Greek mythology)
Qutrub
Redcap
Siyawesi - Benin 
Sprites
Ta'ai, or 小黑人 - in the mythology of, or remembered by, the Saisiyat people of Taiwan
Taotao Mona
Tikoloshe
Tiyanak
Tomte / Tonttu / Nisse - Scandinavian Folklore
Trauco - Chilote mythology
Trows - Orkney and Shetland folklore
Tylwyth Teg
Vazimba
Woodarjee - Noongar mythology
Yumboes
Zlydzens

Types of little people in fictional mythologies
Hobbits / Halflings / Kenders
Tcho-Tcho
Lilliputian

Little people in literature 

 The Borrowers by Mary Norton
 The Littles by John Peterson
 The Wee Free Men by Terry Pratchett
 The Nome Trilogy by Terry Pratchett
 The Spiderwick Chronicles by Holly Black and Tony DiTerlizzi
 1q84 by Haruki Murakami
 Rumpelstiltskin

See also
 Atacama skeleton
 Dwarfism
 Hobbit
 Homo floresiensis
 Little green men
 Pygmy peoples
 List of the verified shortest people 
 San Pedro Mountains Mummy

References

Bibliography
Daniels, Cora Linn and Stevens, C.M. Encyclopaedia of Superstitions, Folklore, and the Occult Sciences of the World. Milwaukee, Wisc.: J. H. Tewdai & Sons, 1903.
Frey, Rodney. The World of the Crow Indians: As Driftwood Lodges. Norman, Okla.: University of Oklahoma Press, 1993.

Mythological archetypes
Anishinaabe mythology
Legendary creatures of the indigenous peoples of North America
Mythic humanoids
Mining folklore